The 2007 Daytona 500, the 49th running of the event, was the first race of the 2007 NASCAR Nextel Cup Series season, taking place on February 18, 2007, at Daytona International Speedway in Daytona Beach, Florida. Kevin Harvick won the race by 0.02 second over Mark Martin in the closest finish since the first race at Daytona International Speedway when it took three days to declare Lee Petty the winner in 1959.

Entry list

Qualifying

Tony Stewart, driving the #20 Chevrolet Monte Carlo SS for Joe Gibbs Racing, won the first Gatorade Duel race, while Jeff Gordon drove the #24 Hendrick Motorsports Chevrolet to the checkered flag in the second race. However, widespread rules infractions that affected five teams – the #17 Roush Fenway Racing Ford Fusion team of Matt Kenseth, the three Evernham Motorsports Dodge Charger teams of Kasey Kahne (#9), Scott Riggs (#10) and Elliott Sadler (#19 car) – were discovered during the Pole Qualifying on February 11.  But, a sixth team – the #55 Toyota Camry from Michael Waltrip Racing driven by the teams' owner – suffered the most severe punishment handed out by the motorsports sanctioning body since 2000, as it was docked 100 driver and owner points, causing it to leave Daytona with negative owner and championship points (−27 points).  In addition, Gordon was penalized with the loss of his starting position after the #24 Chevrolet failed a post-race inspection because of an improper spoiler height.  His starting position was changed from fourth to 42nd.  There were no other penalties assessed against himself or the team and he remained listed as the winner of the second duel race.

Bill Elliott was not the only past Daytona 500 champion to miss the race, as 25 other cars battled for a set of seven spots in the starting grid. Ward Burton (who won in 2002) and Derrike Cope (the 1990 winner) did not qualify from their respective races. Elliott was not eligible for the past champion's provisional, as it was given to Dale Jarrett, who was the more recent champion.

Before the green flag the following drivers dropped to the rear of the field for the reasons indicated: #00 – David Reutimann (transmission change), #18 – J. J. Yeley (transmission change), #41 – Reed Sorenson (transmission change). #24 – Jeff Gordon (failed post race inspection after winning the Gatorade Duel race #2, Gordon was supposed to start 4th).

Pre-race
Kelly Clarkson, the first winner of American Idol and spokesperson for the 2007 edition of "NASCAR Day", performed in the pre-race "Salute to America" concert, with her set consisting of Since U Been Gone, One Minute (from her third studio album My December) and Miss Independent. Big and Rich sang the National Anthem, while Academy Award winning actor Nicolas Cage served as the grand marshal of the event, giving the command to have the drivers start their engines in a low-key manner.  Baseball ironman and 2007 inductee into the Baseball Hall of Fame Cal Ripken Jr. drove the Chevrolet Corvette Z06 pace car for the pre-race laps, and Phil Parsons, the brother of Benny Parsons, who had died of complications from lung cancer prior to the season, was given the honor of dropping the green flag for the race.

Race summary

David Gilliland was in the front of the field when the green flag waved. The first caution came on lap 16 when Boris Said moved up the track coming off of turn 2, most likely unaware that David Reutimann was there, and spun. He had very minor damage and continued the race from there. The race then stayed under the green flag for about 60 laps, during which Tony Stewart took the lead from Kurt Busch. On lap 79, Kyle Petty hit the wall after his rear tire blew out, bringing out another yellow flag. He went behind the wall for repairs. Reutimann obtained the free pass to return to the lead lap. Kurt Busch took the lead again during most of the next green flag period, only being passed by Ryan Newman for one lap on lap 128, and then by Stewart again on lap 150.

On lap 152, Stewart got on the apron in turn 4, got loose, and spun into Kurt Busch. He spun to a halt, while Busch kept the engine going and went to the garage area for repairs. However, with 46 laps to go, he was unable to continue and did not finish the race. A fourth caution came on lap 175 when a 5-car crash involving Reutimann, Denny Hamlin, Jimmie Johnson, Jeff Green and Tony Raines occurred in the backstretch. Mark Martin took the lead shortly before the yellow flag came out. Another crash which took out Ken Schrader happened on lap 186, after contact from Dave Blaney who was parked for the remainder of the race (who may have been unaware of his right front tire being flat according to Darrell Waltrip). With 5 laps to go, Matt Kenseth ran into Jamie McMurray, who hit the wall and collected Dale Earnhardt Jr. with him. Ricky Rudd and Martin Truex Jr. were collected as well. Rudd remained on the lead lap, but Truex fell a lap down. McMurray and Earnhardt Jr. both were out of the race, finishing 31st and 32nd, respectively. The race was delayed for approximately 12 minutes for cleanup under the red flag. This set up a green-white-checkered finish.

With 2 laps to go, an outside line began to form, with Kevin Harvick, Kenseth and Jeff Burton. Martin came to the white flag looking for a victory. On the backstretch, Kyle Busch, sitting 2nd place, tried both ways to get around Martin. Meanwhile, Kenseth began to bump-draft Harvick, with Burton in tow. Harvick flew by David Stremme, Gilliland, Mike Wallace, David Ragan and Greg Biffle. Busch, trying to get around Martin and block Harvick at the same, nearly squeezed Harvick into the wall as Harvick zipped past him and pulled even with Martin. Harvick and Martin, Busch and Kenseth, and Biffle and Burton were side by side out of turn 4. With the checkered flag in sight, Busch hit the apron, getting him loose. He spun out and started a chain reaction collecting most of the field. Clint Bowyer took the worst hit, turning over on his roof and skidding across the finish line on it while on fire before flipping back upright in the grass. Harvick beat Martin by .02 of a second to claim the victory. After being 6th place out of turn 4, Burton finished 3rd. Mike Wallace and David Ragan were surprises, rounding out the Top 5.

Results

Controversy over the finish
Because of an incident between Casey Mears and Dale Jarrett at the 2003 Sylvania 300 in New Hampshire International Speedway, NASCAR mandated a "freezing of the field" policy whenever a caution flag is thrown, effectively ending the phenomenon that is racing back to the caution.  Such a flag did not fly after the last-lap crash.  There is some disputed visual evidence that suggests that, if the caution had flown strictly according to NASCAR rules, Martin may have won.

The issue was especially passionate because Martin was in his 23rd Daytona 500 start and had never won. Such a win, arguably, would have been popular with fans, similar to Dale Earnhardt's 1998 victory (in his 20th start) or Darrell Waltrip's 1989 triumph (in his 17th).  Martin retired following the 2013 season, never having achieved a Daytona 500 victory in his 29 attempts.

In some races, NASCAR has permitted the cars to run to the finish in case of more "minor" spins on the last lap.

References

Daytona 500
Daytona 500
NASCAR races at Daytona International Speedway
February 2007 sports events in the United States